Giga Chikadze (Georgian: გიგა ჭიკაძე, born 25 August 1988) is a Georgian mixed martial artist and former kickboxer. He currently competes in the Featherweight division in the Ultimate Fighting Championship (UFC). Chikadze formerly competed in the Featherweight division for GLORY. As of 13 December 2021, he is #8 in the UFC featherweight rankings.

Background 

Giga Chikadze was born on 25 August 1988 in Tbilisi. Between ages 4 and 5, he began to train in Gōjū-ryū Karate. As a child, he inspired to join after watching martial arts movies by Jet Li and Bruce Lee. His first introduction to MMA was watching the early UFC events (specifically UFC 1) on VHS tapes, he was very impressed with Royce Gracie with his capabilities of defeating opponents of larger size while wearing a keikogi.

Chikadze started competing in Kickboxing, moving to the Netherlands for training and in 2015 he joined GLORY, the world's largest kickboxing organization.

Mixed martial arts career

World Series of Fighting 

Chikadze made his mixed martial arts debut as a lightweight in the WSOF, facing Xtreme Couture fighter Gil Guardado. He lost the fight by unanimous decision.

Gladiator Challenge 

Chikadze would join a promotion known as the Gladiator Challenge, and would enjoy a five-fight win streak in which all fights were ended via first-round knockout.

Dana White's Tuesday Night Contender Series 

In mid-June, Chikadze would join UFC president Dana White's Dana White's Contender Series 10 in Las Vegas, Nevada to face former Ultimate Fighter contestant Austin Springer in a featherweight bout. Chikadze would receive his second professional loss in his MMA career after submitting to a rear-naked choke in the third round.

Return to the Gladiator Challenge 

After losing to Springer, Chikadze would return to the lightweight division of the Gladiator Challenge, earning a quick submission victory and a swift TKO after that.

Ultimate Fighting Championship 

Giga Chikadze would sign a four-fight contract with the UFC and would be scheduled to make his UFC debut against fellow Contender Series fighter Mike Davis at UFC Fight Night 160 in Copenhagen, Denmark. However, Davis would pull out of the fight due to health issues and would be replaced by Brandon Davis in a short-notice bout. After three rounds passed, the fight would be declared a split draw, but due to a scoring error made by one of the judges of the bout, the outcome would be corrected to a split decision victory for Chikadze.

Chikadze would make his next UFC appearance on the preliminary card of UFC 248 against featherweight Jamall Emmers. Chikadze would earn a razor-thin split decision victory over Emmers after the bout had ended.

Chikadze, once again, would be scheduled to face Mike Davis on 16 May 2020 at UFC on ESPN 8. However, Davis would pull out of the bout due to a weight cut-related illness and would be replaced by promotional newcomer Irwin Rivera. Chikadze would win the fight by unanimous decision.

Chikadze was scheduled to face Alex Caceres on 29 August 2020 at UFC Fight Night 175.  However, Chikadze withdrew from the bout due to tested positive for COVID-19  and he was replaced by promotional newcomer Kevin Croom.

Chikadze faced Omar Morales on  11 October 2020 at UFC Fight Night 179. He won the fight via unanimous decision despite knocking Morales down in the final round.

Chikadze faced promotional newcomer Jamey Simmons on 7 November 2020 at UFC on ESPN 17. He won the fight via technical knockout in round one. This win earned him the Performance of the Night award.

Chikadze faced Cub Swanson on 1 May 2021 at UFC on ESPN 23. He won the bout in the first round via technical knockout after catching Swanson with a kick to the liver. This win earned him the Performance of the Night bonus award.

Chikadze faced Edson Barboza on 28 August 2021 at UFC on ESPN 30. He won the back-and-forth fight via technical knockout in round three. This win earned him the Performance of the Night award.

Chikadze faced Calvin Kattar in the main event on 15 January 2022 at UFC on ESPN 32. He lost the fight via unanimous decision after being knocked down and almost finished in the final seconds of the fight. This fight earned him the Fight of the Night award.

On 22 May 2022, it was announced that Chikadze will receive UFC 2022 Recipient of Forrest Griffin Community Award for his exceptional volunteer and charity work
for his non-profit "Knockout Cancer Foundation" that assists individuals fighting cancer with financial support for medical bills.

Chikadze was scheduled to face Sodiq Yusuff on September 17, 2022 at UFC Fight Night 210.  However, the week before the event, Chikadze withdrew due to injury and the bout was cancelled.

Personal life 
Chikadze has stated that he went to college and graduated with a degree in Business Management.

Championships and accomplishments

Mixed martial arts 
Ultimate Fighting Championship
Performance of the Night (Three times) 
Fight of the Night (One time) 
2022 Forrest Griffin Community Award
MMAjunkie.com
2020 Under the Radar Fighter of the Year
2021 Breakout Fighter of the Year

Mixed martial arts record 

|-
|Loss
|align=center|14–3
|Calvin Kattar
|Decision (unanimous)
|UFC on ESPN: Kattar vs. Chikadze
|
|align=center|5
|align=center|5:00
|Las Vegas, Nevada, United States
|
|-
|Win
|align=center|14–2
|Edson Barboza
|TKO (punches)
|UFC on ESPN: Barboza vs. Chikadze
|
|align=center|3
|align=center|1:44
|Las Vegas, Nevada, United States
|
|-
|Win
|align=center|13–2
|Cub Swanson
|TKO (body kick and punches)
|UFC on ESPN: Reyes vs. Procházka
|
|align=center|1
|align=center|1:03
|Las Vegas, Nevada, United States
|
|-
|Win
|align=center|12–2
|Jamey Simmons
|TKO (head kick and punches)
|UFC on ESPN: Santos vs. Teixeira
|
|align=center|1
|align=center|3:51
|Las Vegas, Nevada, United States
|
|-
|Win
|align=center|11–2
|Omar Morales
|Decision (unanimous)
|UFC Fight Night: Moraes vs. Sandhagen
|
|align=center|3
|align=center|5:00
|Abu Dhabi, United Arab Emirates
|
|-
|Win
|align=center|10–2
|Irwin Rivera
|Decision (unanimous)
|UFC on ESPN: Overeem vs. Harris
|
|align=center|3
|align=center|5:00
|Jacksonville, Florida, United States
|
|-
|Win
|align=center|9–2
|Jamall Emmers
|Decision (split)
|UFC 248
|
|align=center|3
|align=center|5:00
|Las Vegas, Nevada, United States
|
|-
|Win
|align=center|8–2
|Brandon Davis
|Decision (split)
|UFC Fight Night: Hermansson vs. Cannonier
|
|align=center|3
|align=center|5:00
|Copenhagen, Denmark
|
|-
|Win
|align=center|7–2
|Damien Manzanares
|TKO (submission to punches)
|Gladiator Challenge: MMA World Championships
|
|align=center|1
|align=center|0:45
|Whitney, California, United States
|
|-
|Win
|align=center|6–2
|C.J. Baines
|Submission (armbar)
|Gladiator Challenge: Summer Showdown
|
|align=center|1
|align=center|0:12
|Rancho Mirage, California, United States
|
|-
|Loss
|align=center|5–2
|Austin Springer
|Submission (rear-naked choke)
|Dana White's Contender Series 10
|
|align=center|3
|align=center|4:10
|Las Vegas, Nevada, United States
|
|-
|Win
|align=center|5–1
|Kevin Ceron
|TKO (punch)
|Gladiator Challenge: MMA Fighting Championship
|
|align=center|1
|align=center|2:37
|Rancho Mirage, California, United States
|
|-
|Win
|align=center|4–1
|Kevin Gratts
|KO (punch)
|Gladiator Challenge: Season's Beatings
|
|align=center|1
|align=center|1:17
|Rancho Mirage, California, United States
|
|-
|Win
|align=center|3–1
|Julian Hernandez
|TKO (punch)
|Gladiator Challenge: Summer Feud
|
|align=center|1
|align=center|0:49
|Rancho Mirage, California, United States
|
|-
|Win
|align=center|2–1
|Anthony Ross
|TKO (punch)
|Gladiator Challenge: Absolute Beat Down
|
|align=center|1
|align=center|0:10
|San Jacinto, California, United States
|
|-
|Win
|align=center|1–1
|Joe Bear
|TKO (retirement)
|Gladiator Challenge: Season's Beatings
|
|align=center|1
|align=center|1:50
|San Jacinto, California, United States
|
|-
|Loss
|align=center|0–1
|Gil Guardado
|Decision (unanimous)
|World Series of Fighting 26: Palmer vs. Almeida
|
|align=center|3
|align=center|5:00
|Las Vegas, Nevada, United States
|

Kickboxing record (incomplete) 

|-
|-  style="background:#FFBBBB;"
| 2017-12-23 || Loss ||align=left| Dylan Salvador || Glory of Heroes: Jinan – GOH 65 kg Championship Tournament, Semi-Finals || Jinan, China || Ex. R Decision (Unanimous) || 4 || 3:00
|-  style="background:#FFBBBB"
| 2017-07-14 || Loss ||align=left| Kevin VanNostrand|| Glory 43: New York – Featherweight Championship Tournament, Final || New York City, New York, US || Decision (unanimous) || 3 || 3:00
|-
|-  style="background:#CCFFCC"
| 2017-07-14 || Win ||align=left| Aleksei Ulianov || Glory 43: New York – Featherweight Championship Tournament, Semi-Finals|| New York City, New York, US || Decision (split) || 3 ||3:00
|-
|-  bgcolor="#CCFFCC"
| 2017-01-20 || Win ||align=left| Victor Pinto || Glory 37: Los Angeles || Los Angeles, California, US || KO (liver kick)|| 1 || 2:03
|-
|-  bgcolor=#FFBBBB
| 2016-09-09 || Loss ||align=left| Matthew Embree || Glory 33: New Jersey – Featherweight Contender Tournament, Final || Trenton, New Jersey, US || TKO (punch)|| 2 || 1:28
|-
|-  bgcolor="#CCFFCC"
| 2016-09-09 || Win ||align=left| Serhiy Adamchuk || Glory 33: New Jersey – Featherweight Contender Tournament, Semi-Finals || Trenton, New Jersey, US || Decision (Split) || 3 || 3:00
|-
|-  bgcolor="#CCFFCC"
| 2016-07-22 || Win ||align=left| Chris Mauceri || Glory 32: Virginia || Norfolk, Virginia, US || KO (liver kick) || 1 || 2:20
|-
|-  bgcolor="#CCFFCC"
| 2016-02-26 || Win ||align=left| Kevin VanNostrand || Glory 27: Chicago || Hoffman Estates, Illinois, US || Decision (unanimous) || 3 || 3:00
|-
|-
|-  bgcolor=#FFBBBB
| 2015-08-07 || Loss ||align=left| Anvar Boynazarov || Glory 23: Las Vegas || Las Vegas, Nevada, US || Decision (split) || 3 || 3:00
|-
|-  bgcolor="#CCFFCC"
| 2015-05-08 || Win ||align=left| Ken Tran || Glory 21: San Diego || San Diego, California, US || KO || 3 || 2:19
|-
|-  style="background:#CCFFCC"
| 2014-10-04 || Win ||align=left| Armen Zakyan  || Fight Fans|| || KO (Head kick) || 2 ||0:35
|-  style="background:#FFBBBB;"
| 2014-02-08 || Loss ||align=left| Christian Baya || Fight Fans VIII || Netherlands || Decision || 3 || 3:00
|-
|-  style="background:#FFBBBB"
| 2014-01-12|| Loss||align=left| Tayfun Özcan || Enfusion Live 12 || Alkmaar, Netherlands || Decision (Unanimous) || 3 || 3:00

|-  style="background:#FFBBBB"
| 2013-10-12 || Loss ||align=left| Ashkan Gohar || Thai Boxing Gala || Emmen, Netherlands || TKO (Doctor stoppage) || 1 ||

|-  style="background:#FFBBBB"
| 2013-02-03 || Loss ||align=left| Abraham Roqueñi || Street Culture Fight Night 2 || Tenerife, Spain || KO (Back kick) || 1 ||

|-  style="background:#CCFFCC"
| 2012-12-28 || Win ||align=left| Anthony Kane ||Soema Na Basi || Paramaribo, Suriname || Decision || 3 ||3:00

|-  style="background:#CCFFCC"
| 2012-12-01 || Win ||align=left| Hicham Boubkari |||||| Decision || 3 ||3:00
|-  style="background:#CCFFCC"
| 2012-05-27 || Win ||align=left| Otman Allach ||Muay Thai event Slamm 7 || Stedenwijk Almere ||  Decision || 3 ||3:00

|-  style="background:#FFBBBB"
| 2012-03-06 || Loss ||align=left| Shkodran Veseli  || WFC Challengers 3 || Vienna, Austria || KO (Punches)|| 2 || 
|-  style="background:#cfc;"
| 2011-05-21 || Win ||align=left| Evgeniy Kurovskoy || Fightclub presents: It's Showtime 2011 || Amsterdam, Netherlands || Decision (unanimous) || 3 || 3:00
|-  style="background:#CCFFCC"
| 2011-04-10 || Win ||align=left| Nordin Kassrioui  || || || TKO (Doctor Stoppage) || 1 ||
|-  style="background:#FFBBBB"
| 2009-12-19 || Loss ||align=left| Shemsi Beqiri  || WFC Fight Night || Zürich, Switzerland || Decision || 5 || 3:00
|-
! style=background:white colspan=9 |
|-
|-  style="background:#CCFFCC"
| 2008 || Win ||align=left| Domino Ross  |||| || KO (Punch) ||  ||
|-
| colspan=9 | Legend:

See also 
 List of current UFC fighters
 List of male mixed martial artists

References

External links 
 
 

Living people
1988 births
Featherweight mixed martial artists
Male mixed martial artists from Georgia (country)
Mixed martial artists utilizing Gōjū-ryū
Mixed martial artists utilizing Kyokushin kaikan
Mixed martial artists utilizing kickboxing
Male kickboxers from Georgia (country)
Featherweight kickboxers
Sportspeople from Tbilisi
Male karateka from Georgia (country)
Glory kickboxers
Ultimate Fighting Championship male fighters